The Jobi tree frog ("Litoria" obtusirostris) is a species of frog in the subfamily Pelodryadinae, endemic to West Papua, Indonesia.

Sources

obtusirostris
Amphibians of Western New Guinea
Amphibians described in 1875
Taxonomy articles created by Polbot